Wheelock's Latin (originally titled Latin and later Latin: An Introductory Course Based on Ancient Authors) is a comprehensive beginning Latin textbook. Chapters introduce related grammatical topics and assume little or no prior knowledge of Latin grammar or language. Each chapter has a collection of translation exercises created specifically for the book, most drawn directly from ancient sources. Those from Roman authors (Sententiae Antiquae—lit., "ancient sentences" or "ancient thoughts") and the reading passages that follow may be either direct quotations or adapted paraphrases of the originals.  Interspersed in the text are introductory remarks on Ancient Roman culture.  At the end of each chapter is a section called "Latina Est Gaudium — Et Utilis!", which means "Latin Is Fun — And Useful!"  This section introduces phrases that can be used in conversation (such as "Quid agis hodie?", meaning "How are you today?"), and in particular comments on English words and their relation to Latin. Originally published in 1956 in the Barnes & Noble College Outline Series, the textbook is currently in its seventh edition. The 6th edition has been translated into Korean (2005), with a Korean translation of the 7th edition pending; the 7th edition has been translated into Chinese (2017).

The most recent edition includes a foreword, preface, comments on the revised edition, maps, and numerous black and white photographs. It also provides help with pronunciation and information about the Roman authors presented in the chapter readings.

Publication history
Wheelock F. M. - Latin.  New York: Barnes & Noble, 1956. xxxiii & 301 p.  College Outline Series #104.  $1.95.  Prof. Wheelock (1902-1987) was Professor of Humanities at Cazenovia Junior College at the time of publication.
Wheelock F. M. - Latin: An introductory course based on ancient authors. 2nd ed. New York : Barnes & Noble, 1960. xxxiii & 377 p.
Wheelock F. M. - Latin: An introductory course based on ancient authors. 3rd ed. New York : Barnes & Noble, 1963. xxxiii & 457 p.  The Barnes & Noble Outline Series #104.  Prof. Wheelock was Professor Emeritus of Classics at the University of Toledo at the time of publication.
Wheelock F. M. - Wheelock's Latin Grammar. 4th ed., revised. New York : HarperCollins, 1992. xxvi & 418 p.
Wheelock F. M. and R. A. LaFleur. Wheelock's Latin 5th Edition. New York: HarperCollins, 1995. xli & 498 p.
Wheelock F. M. and R. A. LaFleur. Wheelock's Latin 6th Edition. New York: HarperCollins, 2000. l & 510 p.
Wheelock F. M. and R. A. LaFleur. Wheelock's Latin 6th Edition, Revised. New York: HarperCollins, 2005. xlviii & 512 p.
Wheelock F. M. and R. A. LaFleur. Wheelock's Latin 7th Edition (The Wheelock's Latin Series). New York: HarperCollins, 2011. xliv + 564 p. .

References

External links
Official Website
archive.org page

Latin textbooks
20th-century Latin books